BichSAM or Asam may refer to:

 American Society of Addiction Medicine, an addiction medicine professional society
 `Asam, a village in eastern Yemen
 Asam (surname)
 Asian Americans, Americans of Asian descent
 Association for Standardisation of Automation and Measuring Systems, a professional association that coordinates the development of technical standards
 Australian School of Advanced Medicine, a medical school associated with Macquarie University in Sydney, Australia
 Avrasya Stratejik Araştırmalar Merkezi, Center for Eurasian Strategic Studies, based in Turkey
 Asam, another name for Tamarind, the leguminous tree native to tropical Africa

See also
 Assam (disambiguation)
 Dainik Asam, a daily Assamese Newspaper